James Wall is an English retired association football defender who played professionally in England and the United States.

In July 1999, Wall signed with Hereford United on a free transfer from Derby County F.C. where he had spent his youth years. He played fourteen games for Hereford, scoring one goal, in his first season, but went on loan to Burton Albion for nine games. On 6 April 2001, Wall transferred to the Nashville Metros of the USL A-League. He was Second Team All League that season. In August 2001, Wall was back with Burton Albion. On 7 December 2001, Wall signed a three-year contract with the Atlanta Silverbacks. The Silverbacks released him before the 2003 season.

After football James became a proficient player of snap and is often seen on late night trains in his role as quizmaster.

External links
 Hereford United: James Wall

References

Living people
1980 births
Atlanta Silverbacks players
Burton Albion F.C. players
English footballers
English expatriate footballers
Hereford United F.C. players
Nashville Metros players
USL First Division players
Association football defenders
English expatriate sportspeople in the United States
Expatriate soccer players in the United States